St John the Evangelist's Church is in Fountains Road, Kirkdale, Liverpool, Merseyside, England.  It is an active Roman Catholic parish church in Pastoral Area of Liverpool North, in the Archdiocese of Liverpool.  The church is recorded in the National Heritage List for England as a designated Grade II listed building.

History

The church was built in 1885, and designed by J. and B. Sinnott.  The north chapel was added in 1927.

Architecture

Exterior
St John's is constructed in rock-faced stone, with ashlar bands and dressings, under a slate roof.  It consists of a nave and chancel with no structural division, north and south aisles under lean-to roofs, a clerestory, north and south transepts, north and south chapels, a canted baptistry at the west end, and a southwest porch.  At the southeast corner is a turret with a belfry, and an octagonal pyramidal roof.  The west window of the nave has a five-light window with Geometrical tracery.  Along the sides of the aisles are three-light windows, and along the clerestory are two-light windows, all of which are paired between buttresses.  The south transept has a five-light window, and the north transept forms the organ loft.  The east window has seven lights, and each chapel has a rose window.  The porch has a pointed arch and a shaped gable.

Interior
Inside the church is a west gallery.  The nave has a waggon roof, and four-bay arcades carried on round columns.  The chancel arcade has two bays with clustered columns.  The reredos is in wrought iron.  The altar, dated 1898, was designed by Pugin & Pugin.

See also

Grade II listed buildings in Liverpool-L4

References and notes
Notes

Citations

External links

Parish & Church website

Grade II listed buildings in Liverpool
Grade II listed churches in Merseyside
Roman Catholic churches in Liverpool
Roman Catholic churches completed in 1885
19th-century Roman Catholic church buildings in the United Kingdom
Gothic Revival church buildings in England
Gothic Revival architecture in Merseyside